Paul Jonathan Blake (10 December 1958 – 30 May 2011) billed as Jon Blake and Sonny Blake, was an Australian actor who was primarily active in the 1980s. He appeared in several TV shows and films, including a leading role in Scott Hicks's Freedom (1982), before a car accident in 1986 left him severely disabled.

Biography 
Blake was born Paul Jonathan Gleason in the Sydney suburb of Hornsby in 1958, an only child of parents who were classical musicians. His family moved back and forth between New Zealand and Australia before permanently settling in Sydney when he was ten.

In his youth, Blake trained as a professional boxer and studied music at the Sydney Conservatorium. He also spent several years in student and experimental theatre groups and took private acting lessons while working as an usher at a city cinema complex.

While attending Glenaeon, an independent K-12 school at Middle Cove, New South Wales, Blake starred in many school productions. In 1976, an acquaintance of his history teacher who was a TV producer was considering various actors to star in a new TV soap called The Restless Years. This became Blake's first screen role on commercial television. He was credited as Sonny Blake. During his time on the show, Blake continued to take acting lessons and would eventually study at the Stella Adler Studio of Acting in New York City.

After leaving The Restless Years, Blake worked in television and theatre, including a role in the revival of On Our Selection. He quickly progressed to miniseries and films. One of his highest-profile parts was a starring role in the Australian television miniseries Anzacs. His good looks led to him being named by Cleo magazine as one of their most eligible bachelors of 1986. Blake's charismatic presence and fast-rising star led to him being dubbed "the next Mel Gibson", with mentions of several work opportunities in the United States and talk of a new Mad Max film.

Accident
On 1 December 1986, Blake was badly injured in a car accident while driving home after the last day of filming The Lighthorsemen in the South Australian desert. An oncoming car appeared in his path and he swerved to avoid it, crashing into a car which was parked on the side of the road. Blake was not expected to survive the accident. His only external injuries were a slight graze on his cheekbone and a cut to his temple, but he sustained permanent brain damage in the accident and was left paralysed and unable to speak.

Court cases
After several long and complex legal battles and appeals, represented by Sydney lawyer Tim Kelly, Blake was awarded $33.3 million in compensation for his caretaking and lost future earnings. This was later reduced to $7.67 million on appeal. The amount was decided on the basis that there was a 15% chance Blake would have attained superstar status in Hollywood and a 35% chance of him achieving considerable success. Academy Award-winning filmmaker George Miller, producer Hal McElroy, critic David Stratton and actor Peter Phelps all testified about Blake's potential.

Up until her death in 2007, Blake's mother Mascot was his primary caregiver. His son Dustin then cared for him until his death.

Death
Blake died on 30 May 2011, aged 52, from complications from pneumonia.

Filmography

References

External links
 
 http://bajaclub.homestead.com/jonblake.html
 http://www.smh.com.au/lifestyle/people/aussie-actor-jon-blake-dies-20110530-1fcj4.html
 http://www.news.com.au/breaking-news/australian-actor-jon-blake-dies/story-e6frfku0-1226065889860

1958 births
2011 deaths
Australian male film actors
Australian male television actors
Deaths from pneumonia in New South Wales
People with disorders of consciousness